Erith Urban District Council Tramways operated a passenger tramway service in Erith between 1905 and 1933.

History

Erith Urban District Council launched this tramway system to connect with the London County Council network at Plumstead.

Services started on 26 August 1905 with tramcars purchased from Brush Electrical Engineering Company.

Routes
The main route ran from Abbey Wood to Belvedere and Erith, where it split into two short branches - one along Bexley Road (now the A220 road) and one towards Slade Green (now the A206 road).

Closure

The services were taken over by London Passenger Transport Board on 1 July 1933.

References

Tram transport in England
Trams in London